Richard Blackmore (1654–1729) was an English poet and physician.

Richard Blackmore may also refer to:

Richard Blackmore (American football) (born 1956), former American football defensive back
R. D. Blackmore (1825–1900), English novelist
Richie Blackmore (rugby league) (born 1969), New Zealand rugby league coach and former player
Ritchie Blackmore (born 1945), English musician
Richard Blackmore (footballer) (born 1953), English footballer